Aruna Alwis Wijesiri Gunawardene (born 31 March 1969) is a former Sri Lankan cricketer who played one One Day International in 1994.

External links
 

1969 births
Living people
Sri Lankan cricketers
Sri Lanka One Day International cricketers
Sinhalese Sports Club cricketers
Moors Sports Club cricketers